The 2005 Victorian Football League season was the 124th season of the Australian rules football competition. The premiership was won by the Sandringham Football Club, after it defeated Werribee in the Grand Final on 18 September by nine points; it was Sandringham's ninth top-division premiership, and the second of three premierships won consecutively by the club between 2004 and 2006.

Ladder

Finals Series

Grand Final

Awards
The Jim 'Frosty' Miller Medal was won by James Podsiadly (Werribee), who kicked 66 goals.
The J. J. Liston Trophy was won jointly by Ian Callinan (Tasmania) and Paul Johnson (Sandringham), who each polled 16 votes. Callinan and Johnson finished ahead of Digby Morrell (Northern Bullants), who was third with 15 votes.
The Fothergill-Round Medal was won by Jackson Barling (Williamstown).
Williamstown won the reserves premiership. Williamstown 16.7 (103) defeated North Ballarat 12.9 (81) in the Grand Final, held as a curtain-raiser to the Seniors Grand Final on 18 September.

See also 
 List of VFA/VFL premiers
 Australian rules football
 Victorian Football League
 Australian Football League
 2005 AFL season

References

External links
AFL Victoria website
TRUenergy VFL website

Victorian Football League seasons
VFL